Kawartha Lakes Bible College (KLBC) is a defunct evangelical Bible college that was located in Peterborough, Ontario from 1973 to 2005. By 2007, the small site had become a detoxification centre, and by 2021 it had become a clinic providing mental health services to military, health care and first responder personnel.

History
KLBC was founded as Kawartha Lakes Bible School (KLBS) in 1973, which offered night classes in intensive biblical studies. In 1977 KLBS began operating as a full-time day school located at Edmison Heights Bible Chapel. Beginning in 1994 a second year program was started.

KLBC closed in 2005. Emmaus Bible College has undertaken the responsibility of hosting the academic records and transcripts for Kawartha Lakes Bible College.

Academics
KLBC offered a one year Diploma of Biblical Studies program and a two year Diploma of Advanced Biblical Studies program. Students in these programs received approximately 550 hours of Bible training.

- 17 Bible/ Theology Courses were offered.
- 18 General/ Practical Courses were offered.

Kawartha Lakes Bible College was not an accredited degree granting school, but it was recognized as an educational institution by the Government of Canada.

The college was recognized by the International Council for Evangelical Theological Education and by the Canadian Council of Christian Charities.

Academic transfer

References

Evangelical seminaries and theological colleges in Canada
Bible colleges
Education in Peterborough, Ontario
Universities in Ontario